Oakley is an unincorporated community in Sussex County, Delaware, United States. Oakley is located on Delaware Route 16 east of Greenwood. Oakley was a post village on the Queen Anne's Railroad.

References

Unincorporated communities in Sussex County, Delaware
Unincorporated communities in Delaware